Jack Wender (born May 31, 1954) is a former American football running back. He played for the Tampa Bay Buccaneers in 1977.

References

1954 births
Living people
American football running backs
Fresno State Bulldogs football players
Tampa Bay Buccaneers players